Tony Baldwin (born March 20, 1973) is an American softball coach and currently the head coach for the Georgia Bulldogs softball team.

Early life and education
Tony Baldwin was born on March 20, 1973 in Bloomington, Indiana. Baldwin later chose to attend Butler University. While at Butler, Baldwin was a team captain for the Bulldogs and earned All-MCC honors.

Coaching career

Decatur Blues
After a stint as an assistant coach for Butler, Baldwin served as head coach for the Decatur Blues, a member of the Central Illinois Collegiate League.

Georgia Bulldogs
After his tenure as Decatur Blues head coach, and other stints at Michigan State, Georgia, and North Carolina, Baldwin became the head coach for the Georgia Bulldogs. He replaces Lu Harris-Champer, whom he has coached under for years.

Head coaching record

Personal life
Baldwin is married to his wife Suzanne, and have four children: Ella, Abby, Brady, and Katie.

References

Dartmouth Big Green softball coaches
Georgia Bulldogs softball coaches
Michigan State Spartans softball coaches
North Carolina Tar Heels softball coaches
Living people
American softball coaches
1973 births